Super 2000 is an FIA powertrain specification used in the World Rally Championship, the British Touring Car Championship, the World Touring Car Championship, and other touring car championships. The engines were originally 2 L naturally aspirated, and later being also allowed 1.6 L turbocharged units producing approximately 280 bhp.

The goal of the Super 2000 classification is to allow more manufacturers and privateers to race by reducing the cost of a competitive car.

In order to cut costs and shorten development time, the Super 2000 rally cars originally used a common control gearbox and drivetrain made by the French company, Sadev. The FIA has since announced that Xtrac and Ricardo Consulting Engineers will be allowed to also manufacture S2000 gearboxes to FIA specification. This is to further cut costs by introducing competition into gearbox supply.

These new rules allowed Ford to build from scratch their S2000 Fiesta vehicles in Australia, in as little as 14 weeks, starting out with a Super 1600 chassis and rollcage.

Specifications
Until 2011, FIA specifications for Super 2000 cars were as follows:
Derived from production model, of which at least 2500 have been produced in the past year
Maximum of 2 litre (2000 cc) displacement
8500 rpm maximum
All wheel drive is permitted in rally cars, but not in touring cars.
6-speed sequential gearbox (Control specification), or 5-speed MT gearbox retaining original gear ratios.
Front and rear MacPherson suspension
No electronic driver aids

In 2011 the specifications were revised, allowing 1600 cc turbocharged engines, and the use of 2000 cc normally-aspirated engines rapidly stopped as a result. These 1600 cc turbo engines fully replaced the 2 litre engines.

For the 2014 WTCC season, the TC1 regulations were introduced for touring cars. For the engine this included a larger air intake restrictor allowing power outputs of 380 bhp and more.

Models

Rally cars

New regulations for the FIA World Rally Car were introduced in 2011. WRC cars would use the Super 2000 specification, and be powered by a 1600 cc turbo engine instead of the 2000 cc used previously. The WRC car would thus be based on the current 2011 model Super 2000 cars fitted with a supplementary kit for rallying. The kit must be able to be fitted or removed within a defined time limit.

Notes:

Touring cars

The following cars were built under the TC1 (2014–2017) regulations:
 Chevrolet RML Cruze TC1
 Citroën C-Élysée
 Honda Civic WTCC
 Lada Granta WTCC
 Lada Vesta WTCC
 Volvo S60 Polestar TC1

The following cars were built under the TC2 Turbo (2011–2013) regulations:
 BMW 320 TC
 Chevrolet Cruze 1.6T
 Ford Focus S2000 TC
 Honda Civic WTCC
 Lada Granta WTCC
 SEAT León WTCC
 Volvo C30 Drive

Series
Super 2000 spec cars have run in:

Rally Competitions:
World Rally Championship (as specification of World Rally Car)
World Rally Championship-2 (formerly Super 2000 World Rally Championship or S-WRC)
European Rally Championship (including the former Intercontinental Rally Challenge)
Asia-Pacific Rally Championship
Australian Rally Championship
Italian Rally Championship
Codasur South American Rally Championship
South African Rally Championship

Touring Car competitions:
World Touring Car Championship (2005-2014)
European Touring Car Cup (2002-2017)
ADAC Procar Series (2005-2014)
Swedish Touring Car Championship (2003-2012)
Dominican Touring Series
Russian Touring Car Championship
Asian Touring Car Series

South Africa was the first country in the world to run Super 2000 cars in rallying. Toyota South Africa and Volkswagen South Africa each built 2 cars to compete in the South African Rally Championship in 2005.

See also
Diesel 2000, the related category for diesel powered touring cars
Super 1600, a rally car formula that is primarily used in the Junior World Rally Championship
Super 2000 World Rally Championship, a companion rally series to the World Rally Championship

References

 
Touring car racing
World Rally Championship
Rally groups
Racing car classes